Ptyongnathosia is a genus of moths belonging to the family Tortricidae.

Species
Ptyongnathosia cotopaxiana Razowski & Wojtusiak, 2008
Ptyongnathosia flaminia (Meyrick, 1926)
Ptyongnathosia harpifera Razowski & Wojtusiak, 2009
Ptyongnathosia lativalva Razowski & Wojtusiak, 2010
Ptyongnathosia lobosaccula Razowski & Wojtusiak, 2010
Ptyongnathosia oxybela Razowski, 1988
Ptyongnathosia oxynosocia Razowski & Becker, 2002
Ptyongnathosia palliorana Razowski & Wojtusiak, 2010
Ptyongnathosia pectinata Razowski & Pelz, 2007
Ptyongnathosia spinosa Razowski & Wojtusiak, 2008

See also
List of Tortricidae genera

References

 , 2007: Chrysoxena-group of genera from Ecuador (Lepidoptera: Tortricidae). Shilap Revista de Lepidopterologica 35 (137): 33–46. Full article: .
 , 2009: Tortricidae (Lepidoptera) from the mountains of Ecuador and remarks on their geographical distribution. Part IV. Eastern Cordillera. Acta Zoologica Cracoviensia 51B (1-2): 119–187. doi:10.3409/azc.52b_1-2.119-187. Full article: .
 , 2010: Tortricidae (Lepidoptera) from Peru. Acta Zoologica Cracoviensia 53B (1-2): 73-159. . Full article: .

External links
tortricidae.com

Euliini
Tortricidae genera